Paul "P. J." Pedroncelli Jr. (born April 25, 1990) is an American professional stock car racing driver. He competes full-time in the ARCA Menards Series West, driving the No. 33 Toyota Camry for Pedroncelli Motorsports, and part-time in the ARCA Menards Series, driving the No. 33 Toyota Camry for Pedroncelli Motorsports. He is the son of Paul Pedroncelli.

Racing career

ARCA Menards Series West 
Pedroncelli made his NASCAR Camping World West Series (now the ARCA Menards Series West) debut 2008, running four races at the Irwindale Speedway (2), Douglas County Speedway, and the Altamont Motorsports Park. His best finish was 14th at Douglas County. He ran 4 races the following year, with his best finish coming at the Madera Speedway, finishing 11th. In 2010, Pedroncelli ran 3 races, with a best finish of 14th at the All American Speedway. He only ran 1 race in 2011 at Sonoma Raceway, finishing 13th.

Pedroncelli did not make another start in the series until 2019. He made 1 start, finishing 13th at Sonoma. In 2021, Pedroncelli ran a full season in the No. 33 Toyota Camry for his family's team, Pedroncelli Racing. He had a career year in 2021. His first top ten finish in the series came in the second race of the season, where he finished 3rd at Sonoma. Following a top-five finish at the Colorado National Speedway, he won his first career pole award the following weekend at Irwindale Speedway. He finished 3rd in the race. This started a string of top-ten finishes for Pedroncelli, coming at Portland, Las Vegas, and Roseville. On the final lap of the race, Pedroncelli made the pass for the lead and took the checkered flag for his first ever victory. In the seasons standings, Pedroncelli finished 4th with 433 points.

ARCA Menards Series 
Pedroncelli made his ARCA Menards Series debut, running in the race's paired event with the West Series at the Phoenix Raceway. Pedroncelli finished 11th.

Motorsports career results

ARCA Menards Series

ARCA Menards Series West

References

External links 

1990 births
Living people
ARCA Menards Series drivers
NASCAR drivers
Racing drivers from California
Sportspeople from California